Shin Shin-ae (born June 3, 1959) is a South Korean actress and trot singer. She has been loved by the public by appearing in various media, including televisions programs,  television dramas, movies, and theater plays. She is known for her recent roles in television drama Hometown Cha-Cha-Cha and Lost. She is also known as scene stealer in box office movie Extreme Job (2019). She reunited with her Extreme Job costar Lee Dong-hwi in the fifth film of Myung Film Lab and the hot topic of the 2019 Jeonju International Film Festival, in movie Gukdo Theater (2019).

Shin Shin-ae, is an accomplished singer. Her famous hit song “The World is a Wonderful World, made her called as legendary star of the 90s. She also called "the Queen of Satire Songs". For her dedication to trot music She won the 2018 Proud Korean People Award held at the National Assembly Hall on October 13th 2018 for Contribution to popular music development.

Career

Early life and education 
Shin was born on June 3, 1959 in Sunchang-gun, Jeollabuk-do, South Korea. She enrolled in the Department of Nursing at Korea University. After graduation she worked as a nurse at Hyehwa Hospital which was the predecessor of Korea University Anam Hospital for about two years.

Career as an actress 
She debut in the entertainment industry through the MBC 9th Open Recruitment Talent Test in 1977. Shin still worked as nurse after passing the talent test for a couple years. She captivated the public with her mostly ordinary citizens acting and she continued her acting career by appearing in several dramas.

Shortly after her debut, she made her first public appearance as an assistant host for MBC's Scholarship Quiz. In the early days of her debut, she acted under the stage name Shin Geum-mae (. Her last work under this stage name was MBC drama Birthday Hand (1986). She changed into her real name Shin Shin-ae in MBC drama Winter Flower (1986), where Shin had lead role as Mrs. Cheon.

She rise into stardom 13 years after her debut, thanks to her role in MBC  (1990) as Park Bok-nyeo, Yeombang's wife, who has crossed eyes condition. Her believable performance made Shin won MBC Actor Choice Award for Best Actress in 1990. 26 years later this role also made her won another award “2016 World Luxury Brand Grand Prize” (previously Chairman Dong-dam Joo Award). This role and her iconic hit song “The World is a Wonderful World” were the reason the judges picked her as winner. She accepted it in the award ceremony held at 2 pm on the 22nd at the Art Hall on the first floor of Women's Plaza in Seoul.

In the same year, she debuted as a movie actor in the movie Ghost Baseball Team (1990)and followed by another movie Romance Emperor (1992). Those two movies led her into numerous interviews and requests for film appearances flooded in as result.

Career as a singer 
In the spring of 1993, Shin appeared in the mini-series the KBS2 drama Hope as 'Bongchanne'. This is a character who brags that she has mastered more than a thousand ppongjjak songs, so she had to sing a lot of ppongjjak in the drama. A record producer, singer Kim Soo-hee, encouraged Shin Shin-ae to take advantage of this great opportunity and released her first album with few songs added. Among them, 'The World is a Wonderful World', in which Shin Shin-ae wrote the lyrics of her song, was a huge hit and made Shin suddenly became a popular ppongjjak singer nationwide and triggered "Shin Shin-ae craze". She also made her film debut through film of the same title.

"The World Is a Wonderful World," rose to the top ranks of contemporary music programs such as KBS2 TV Music Top 10 and MBC Decided! It peaked to 3rd and 4th places on the Most Popular Songs, and achieved great popularity, winning the Grand Prize at 1993 MBC All-Star Music Festival. 1993 was a time pop music in its heyday with famous Seo Taiji and Boys, so the popularity of trot song, sung by expressionless Shin Shin-ae while dancing unique dance so-called "Lee-pan-sa-pan" was very unique. 

According to Jang Yu-jeong, professor at Dankook University's College of Liberal Arts and popular music historian "The World Is a Wonderful World," sung by Shin Shin-ae, is a mixture of two songs released in the 1930s. Basically, the lyrics of "The World is a Wonderful World" sung by Kim Jung-gu in 1939, but the lyrics of "Anchhwa Storm" sung by Kim Jung-gu in 1938 have also been partially modified. In the second verse of "Anchhwa Storm," "The old man's topknot twisted and his wife's shoes ran away," was transformed into "The old man's topknot twisted and the old woman's shoes ran away." With Kim Jung-gu, Shin were mentioned in Encyclopedia of Korean Culture as representative singers of genre , also called a comic song, which emerged during the Japanese colonial period.

A year later, She released the song "Money, Money, Money-Money", a satire trot Song about money. It also became a hit, although not as much as her previous work. Shin Shin-ae became more active in music than in her acting in the 1990s. She ended her singing career temporarily in 2003 with the albums Amusement Song, and back to her main job as an actress.

She made a comeback as a singer after 14 years with album titled Yonggungga (2017), a satirical song that tells the story of a loyal child and a rabbit who overcomes difficulties with wisdom. Based on South Korean classic folk tale Byeoljujeon, the song lyric contain stories satirize the powerful who are taking advantage of the weak. Shin Shin-ae won the popular song development category at the 2018 Proud Korean People Awards held at the National Assembly Hall on 13, 2018.

Singer and actress Shin Shin-ae became hot topic when appearing in JTBC Two Yoo Project Sugar Man Season 3 Lunar New Year Trot Special (Season 3 Episode 8 January 24, 2020) with her most famous song “The World is a Wonderful World”. Those lead her to be invited to popular variety show MBC Radio Star.

Other activities 
In 2020, Shin joined My Job-Happy Tomorrow, the third series of the 'We Together Campaign' sponsored by the Ministry of Culture, Sports and Tourism, which is prepared for sympathy between generations of an aging society. Her role is a job ambassador for seniors. Shin visited the job site of the elderly and experiences the job, so it is also called 'experiential life site for the elderly'. 'We Together Campaign' has presented various contents under the themes of low fertility and joint parenting, improving awareness of an aging society, and revitalizing communication between generations.

She once again became hot topic. In December 2020, Shin Shin-ae was awarded by the Minister of Culture, Sports and Tourism of South Korea in recognition of her contribution to active publicity in the provision of job information for the elderly and improvement of awareness of an aging society through 'My Job-Happy Tomorrow'.

Personal life 
Shin Shin-ae is remain single due to her own value, she always said “I think humans come alone and then go alone”. She is also well known for her filial piety towards her mom. She took care of her diabetic and pancreatic cancer mom until the day She died. She is a devoted filial daughter to the extent that in 2005, she received a filial piety award awarded by the mayor of Seoul.

Filmography

Television 
 MBC  Evidence (1977)  as Jang Hee-suk
 MBC  (1977) as Nurse
 MBC  Oil Flower (1977) Deputy Chief of Staff
 MBC Jeonghwa (1977) as a gisaeng
 MBC Wife (1977) as female employee
 MBC You (1977) as Nurse
 MBC Why is that (1977) as Nurse
 MBC Oknyeo (1977) as Aran
 MBC X Reconnaissance Team (1978)
 MBC South Wind Flower (1978) as shop girl
 MBC Smile (1978) as Mun-gi's mother
 MBC  Stairway to Heaven (1978) as wife
 MBC  Bird and Rat (1978) as Choi Min-ja
 MBC  - Blue Mountains (1978) as Ahjumma of the hole shop
 MBC The Last Witness (1979)
 MBC  Handle (1979) as Mi-soon
 MBC Becoming a Mountain, Becoming a River (1979) as Dabang Reji
 MBC Hongsa Chorong (1980) as Staff
 MBC  Suspect  (1980) as Wife
 MBC  Box 6 (1980) as Nurse
 MBC Frugal Family (1980) as Saedak
 MBC Royal Diary (1980)
 MBC  Informant (1981) as Love In (Gyeongsil)
 MBC Winners and Losers (1981) as Daughter-in-law
 MBC Gyodong Madame Suwondaek (1981)
 MBC  Jang Hee-bin (1981) as Yoo Sang-gung
 MBC National Customs Rate (1982) Hundred-year-old geek's son-in-law as the role of So-Nang-Ja
 MBC  Finding People (1962) as Gilja
 MBC  Mama Seo-gung (1982) as Yoon Sang-gung
 MBC  Baeksan Ahn Heejee (1982) as Bunrye
 MBC  Duel of Shaolin Temple (1982) as Aspiring writer
 MBC Park Soon-kyung, The drunkard (1982) as wife
 MBC We'll Awaken the Dawn (1982) as Yang, wife of Heung-soo, a conservative in Ttukbang Village
 MBC Naraya (1982) as Young-ok
 MBC  Yeonyeonyeon (1983) as Satou's wife, Mrs. Kim
 MBC  (1983) as Kim Yang-sook
 MBC  Finding the Groom (1983) as Kim Jeom-rye
 MBC  The Poor People (1983) as poor woman Kim
 MBC  as Cool Special Midnight Footprints (1983) Crazy Country Maiden
 MBC  (1983) as Eom Bok-dong's wife Choi Soon-i
 MBC  The dumb (1983) as eldest daughter
 MBC  Gongmyeongcheop (1983) as Do Gaek-ju's wife
 MBC  (1983) as Old virgin saint
 MBC  Problem drama series moving classroom, We Are Here (1984) as Teacher couple
 MBC  Looking for a Woman (1984) as Country girl Chil-rye
 MBC Spray (1984) as Jin-sook
 MBC Gaet Village (1985) as Dangjindaek, wife of a fishing village chief
 MBC Pampas Grass - Park Pan-do (1985) as Lee Jang's wife
 MBC Birthday Hand (1986) as Kongkongi
 MBC  - Celebrity (1986) as Madame
 MBC Dalgung (1986) as Daughter Gmani
 MBC Winter Flower (1986) as Mrs. Cheon
 MBC  A Pair of Gloves (1987) as Song Jeong-ja
 MBC  Fragrance of chestnut flowers (1987) as Stepmother
 MBC  Divorce Uprising  (1988) as Hwasuni's mother
 MBC Haeho (1988) as North Korean female moderator
 MBC My Age and Turi (1988) as Yang Ran-i's mother
 MBC Encounter Meeting (1988) Seed Concubine
 MBC Armband (1989) as Seungpil's mother
 MBC  Have You Seen the Fairy (1989) as Ji-Young, the wife of a security guard
 MBC My Friend Angel (1989) as Geum Joo
 MBC  (1990) as Park Bok-nyeo
 MBC My Mother (1990)- As Inok
 MBC  Toad and the Moon (1991) as Park Ok-ju
 KBS2 Brother (1991) as Hammer wife Geumsandaek
 MBC  Living in a Cottage by the Railroad (1992) as Jo Young-sook
 MBC Taepyeong Cheonha (1992) as Counseling Director
 MBC Three families under one roof “Why do you look at the dots”  (1992) as Mi-sook
 SBS Biryuncho (1992) as Chae Geum-Hwa
 SBS Bandy's House (1992) as Oh Jong-ji
 KBS2 Hope (1993) as Aunt Pongjjak
 SBS Han River Cuckoo (1993) as Jeong Chun-mae
 SBS Magpie (1994) as Lee Kyung-ok
 KBS2  Pear Flower (1995) as Mr. Park
 KBS2 Seogung (1995) as Mae Hong
 KBS2  There is a crucian carp in Bungeoppang (1996) as Saeteodak
 MBC Scent of Apple Blossom (1996) as Seo Jeong-ran
 KBS2  Pup-Duck Mother and Hong Gil-Dong (1997) as Pup-Duck Mother/Hye-Ran (1 person, 2 roles)
 MBC  Spring and Snow Is Ridiculous (1997) Mokpo House
 KBS2 Spring Day Goes (1997) as Jeon Jeon
 MBC  This Happens (1997) as Son Hee-suk
 KBS2 The Mistress (1997) as Bulne
 SBS Beyond the Horizon (1997) - as Kwak Seo-Woon
 MBC For Love (1998) - as Jung Eun-mi
 SBS Crystal (1999) Bae Geum-ja
 KBS2  (1999) - Paper Flower
 MBC  (2000) - Chief Nurse Cha Sook-ja
 SBS  (2000) as Seoul House Ahjumma
 MBC Hotelier (South Korean TV series) (2001) - as Shin Geum-soon
 MBC  The Pied Piper (2002)- as Shin Jeong-suk
 KBS2 Drama City Crime-Free Village (2003) as Seok Gu-ne
 SBS  (2004) as Jukjip Grandmother
 MBC  (2004) as In-gyu's mother
 KBS2  (2004) as Heeja
 KBS1 } Showers (2005) as Yangpyeong-daek
 KBS2 Drama City - Remodeling is Barefoot (2005) as Lee Jang-daek
 MBC Bad Woman, Good Woman (2007) as Gwi-ok
 MBC Air City (2007) as Go Eun-ah
 SBS  (2007) as Senior Kitchen Senior
 KBS2 Drama City - The Song of an Old Chick (2007) as Yeongcheondaek
 MBC  (2008) as a real estate agent
 CBS Siru Island (2009) as Shaman Lim
 KBS2  (2010) as tenant
 SBS Giant (2010) as Inn's hostess
 KBS2 Romance Town (2011) as Kim Soon-ok
 TV Chosun  (2014) as Lee Sang-hee
 MBC The Most Beautiful Thing in the World (2014) Sandongnee Auntie
 MBC  as Hong Ja-ya
 tvN Hometown Cha-Cha-Cha (2021) as Park Sook-ja
 JTBC Lost (2021) as Book Min-ja

Sitcom [ edit ] 
 MBC  (2000) Park Sang-myeon as Stalker

Film

Stage

Theater

Discography

Album

Ambassadorship and advertisement

Ambassadorship

Awards

Acting award(s)

Music award(s)

Culture award(s)

References

External links 
 
  
 Shin Shin-ae at Daum Encyclopedia 
 Shin Shin-ae at Daum Movie 
 Shin Shin-ae at Naver 

1959 births
Living people
20th-century South Korean actresses
21st-century South Korean actresses
20th-century South Korean women singers
21st-century South Korean women singers